WHKT (1010 AM) is a currently silent radio station licensed to Portsmouth, Virginia, serving Hampton Roads. The station is owned by Chesapeake-Portsmouth Broadcasting Corporation.

History
Although the station's initial application for a construction permit was filed in 1960, it did not sign on until December 12, 1971, as WPMH. It was a daytimer, allowed to broadcast only from sunrise to sunset, to avoid interference with other radio stations.  AM 1010 is a Canadian clear-channel frequency. Years later, the station was permitted to stay on the air around the clock, but using a low power at night.

Expanded band assignment
On March 17, 1997 the Federal Communications Commission (FCC) announced that eighty-eight stations had been given permission to move to newly available "Expanded Band" transmitting frequencies, ranging from 1610 to 1700 kHz, with WPMH authorized to move from 1010 to 1650 kHz.

A construction permit for the expanded band station, also in Portsmouth, was assigned the call sign WAWT on January 9, 1998, which was changed to WHKT the next month. The FCC's initial policy was that both the original station and its expanded band counterpart could operate simultaneously for up to five years, after which owners would have to turn in one of the two licenses, depending on whether they preferred the new assignment or elected to remain on the original frequency. However, this deadline has been extended multiple times, and both stations have remained authorized. One restriction is that the FCC has generally required paired original and expanded band stations to remain under common ownership.

Later history
In 2004, the call sign was changed to WRJR. Chesapeake-Portsmouth purchased WRJR from The Walt Disney Company, along with WHKT, in January 2010. In the interim, despite having previously brokered the station to Chesapeake-Portsmouth, Disney, in an FCC filing, stated that it took WRJR, along with five former Radio Disney stations slated to be sold (including WHKT), off the air on January 22. WRJR did not leave the air.

On July 1, 2010, the station's call sign was changed back to WPMH. On November 19, 2021, the call sign was changed to WHKT, in a swap that moved the call sign WHKT from AM 1270 to AM 1010, and WPMH from AM 1010 to AM 1270.

WHKT went silent on December 15, 2021, "due to the loss of its transmitter site". Responsibility for program origination of "The Lighthouse" religious format was assumed by WPMH on 1270 AM. WHKT briefly resumed operations on December 13, 2022,  "utilizing equipment loaned by another broadcaster", but went silent again on January 4, 2023 because "that equipment had to be returned".

References

External links

 FCC History Cards for WHKT (covering 1960-1980 as WPMH)

HKT
Radio stations established in 1977
1977 establishments in Virginia
Former subsidiaries of The Walt Disney Company